The Syria Billie Jean King Cup team represents Syria in the Billie Jean King Cup tennis competition and are governed by the Syrian Arab Tennis Federation.  They have not competed since 2010.

History
Syria competed in its first Fed Cup in 1994.  Their best result was third in Group II in 2005.

See also
Fed Cup
Syria Davis Cup team

External links

Billie Jean King Cup teams
Fed Cup
Fed Cup